Greece was represented by 24 athletes  at the 2005 World Championships in Athletics in Helsinki, Finland without winning any medals. The best results of the team were Hrysopiyi Devetzi' s 5th place in triple jump and Athina Papayianni finishing 6th in 20 km walk race.

Results

See also
Greece at the IAAF World Championships in Athletics

References

Nations at the 2005 World Championships in Athletics
2005
World Championships in Athletics